Gordon Allen may refer to:

Gordon P. Allen (1929–2010), Democratic member of the North Carolina General Assembly
Gordon F. Allen (1908–1973), professor and administrator at the State University of New York at Brockport

See also
Allen (surname)